Chelsea Academy is a  coeducational Church of England secondary school and sixth form with academy status, located in the Chelsea area of the Royal Borough of Kensington and Chelsea in London, England.

The school was established in 2009 under the sponsorship of Diocese of London and Kensington and Chelsea London Borough Council. The school admits up to 10% of its intake in year 7 based on aptitude in music, while the remaining places are divided equally between applications from pupils with links to the church, and pupils from the immediate local community.

Chelsea Academy offers GCSEs and BTECs as programmes of study for pupils, while sixth form students can choose to study from range of A Levels. The school also has a specialism in Science.

References

External links
Chelsea Academy official website

Secondary schools in the Royal Borough of Kensington and Chelsea
Academies in the Royal Borough of Kensington and Chelsea
Church of England secondary schools in the Diocese of London
Educational institutions established in 2009
2009 establishments in England